Wadi El Rayan is a unique nature protectorate in Faiyum Governorate, Egypt, under the supervision of the Ministry of Environmental Affairs (EEAA).

History 
Wadi el Rayan is mentioned in Coptic sources as Pilihēy, a salt lake west of Kalamoun where Samuel the Confessor liked to rest.

Geography

The valley of Wadi El-Rayan is an area of 1759 km2, 113 km2 of which are the dominating water body of the Wadi El Rayan lakes. It is located about 65 km southwest of Faiyum city and 80 km west of the Nile River. The Wadi has been used for man-made lakes from agricultural drainage which has made a reserve of the two separate Wadi El Rayan Lakes. The reserve is composed of a 50.90 km2 upper lake and a 62.00 km2 lower lake, with waterfalls between the two. Among the springs, there are three sulphur springs at the southern side of the lower lake, with extensive mobile sand dunes. Wadi El Rayan Waterfalls are considered to be the largest waterfalls in Egypt.

At the south and southeast of the springs is Gabal Manqueer Al Rayan, where marine fossils and archeological remains are found. Gabal Madwera, near the lower lake, is known for its extensive dune formations.

In the northwest is Wadi El Hitan, a protectorate containing fossils of extinct whales.

Flora and fauna
The vegetation is confined to inter-dune areas around springs and at the base of large dunes. The vegetation cover is made of 13 species of perennial plants and a few individuals of Calligonum comosum and Zygophyllum album.

Wadi El Rayan accommodates one of the world's few remaining populations of the endangered slender-horned gazelle. The dorcas gazelle is still found in the area in small numbers, while both the fennec fox and Rüppell's fox are scarce. There are 11 species of reptiles, 9 species of mammals, 13 species of resident birds, and 26 species of migrant and vagrant birds.

See also
Bahr Yussef
Crocodilopolis
Faiyum
Fayum alphabet
Faiyum Governorate
Faiyum mummy portraits
Lake Moeris
Roman Egypt

References

External links
 Ministry of Environment Egyptian Environmental Affairs Agency - Natural Protectorates Description

National parks of Egypt
Faiyum Governorate
Ramsar sites in Egypt